Yam is the common name for some plant species in the genus Dioscorea (family Dioscoreaceae) that form edible tubers. The tubers of some other species in the genus, such as D. communis, are toxic.
Yams are perennial herbaceous vines cultivated for the consumption of their starchy tubers in many temperate and tropical regions, especially in West Africa, South America and the Caribbean, Asia, and Oceania. The tubers themselves, also called "yams", come in a variety of forms owing to numerous cultivars and related species.

Yams were independently domesticated on three different continents: Africa (D. rotundata), Asia (D. alata), and the Americas (D. trifida).

Etymology 
The name "yam" appears to derive from Portuguese inhame or Canarian Spanish ñame, which derived from West African languages during trade. However in Portuguese, this name commonly refers to the taro plant (Colocasia esculenta) from the genus Colocasia, as opposed to Dioscorea.  

The main derivations borrow from verbs meaning "to eat". True yams have various common names across multiple world regions.

In some places, other (unrelated) root vegetables are sometimes referred to as "yams", including:
 In the United States, sweet potatoes (Ipomoea batatas), especially those with orange flesh, are often referred to as "yams"
In Australia, the tubers of the Microseris lanceolata, or yam daisy, were a staple food of Aboriginal Australians in some regions. 
 In New Zealand, oca (Oxalis tuberosa) is typically referred to as "yam".
In Malaysia and Singapore, taro (Colocasia esculenta) is referred to as "yam".
In Africa, South and Southeast Asia as well as the tropical Pacific islands Amorphophallus paeoniifolius is grown and known as "elephant foot yam".

Description 

A monocot related to lilies and grasses, yams are vigorous herbaceous,  perennially growing vines from a tuber. They are native to Africa, Asia, and the Americas. Some 870 species of yams are known, a few of which are widely grown for their edible tuber but others of which are toxic. Some yams are also invasive plants, often considered a "noxious weed" outside cultivated areas. 95% of these crops are grown in Africa.

The plant disperses by seed.

The edible tuber has a rough skin that is difficult to peel but readily softened by cooking. The skins vary in color from dark brown to light pink. The majority, or meat, of the vegetable is composed of a much softer substance ranging in color from white or yellow to purple or pink in mature yams.

Cultivation

Yams are cultivated for the consumption of their starchy tubers in many temperate and tropical regions, especially in West Africa, South America and the Caribbean, Asia, and Oceania. A yam crop begins when whole seed tubers or tuber portions are planted into mounds or ridges, at the beginning of the rainy season. The crop yield depends on how and where the sets are planted, sizes of mounds, interplant spacing, provision of stakes for the resultant plants, yam species, and tuber sizes desired at harvest. Small-scale farmers in West and Central Africa often intercrop yams with cereals and vegetables. The seed yams are perishable and bulky to transport. Farmers who do not buy new seed yams usually set aside up to 30% of their harvest for planting the next year. Yam crops face pressure from a range of insect pests and fungal and viral diseases, as well as nematode. Their growth and dormant phases correspond respectively to the wet season and the dry season. For maximum yield, the yams require a humid tropical environment, with an annual rainfall over  distributed uniformly throughout the growing season. White, yellow, and water yams typically produce a single large tuber per year, generally weighing .

Yams suffer from relatively few pests and diseases. There is an  caused by Colletotrichum gloeosporioides which is widely distributed around the world's growing regions. Winch et al., 1984 finds C. gloeosporioides afflicts a large number of Dioscorea spp.

Despite the high labor requirements and production costs, consumer demand for yam is high in certain subregions of Africa, making yam cultivation quite profitable to certain farmers.

Major cultivated species 
Many cultivated species of Dioscorea yams are found throughout the humid tropics. The most economically important are discussed below.

Non-Dioscorea tubers that were historically important in Africa include Plectranthus rotundifolius (the Hausa potato) and P. esculentus (the Livingstone potato); these two tuber crops have now been largely displaced by the introduction of cassava.

D. rotundata and D. cayennensis 
D. rotundata, the white yam, and D. cayennensis, the yellow yam, are native to Africa. They are the most important cultivated yams. In the past, they were considered as two separate species, but most taxonomists now regard them as the same species. Over 200 varieties between them are cultivated.

White yam tuber is roughly cylindrical in shape, the skin is smooth and brown, and the flesh is usually white and firm. Yellow yam has yellow flesh, caused by the presence of carotenoids. It looks similar to the white yam in outer appearance; its tuber skin is usually a bit firmer and less extensively grooved. The yellow yam has a longer period of vegetation and a shorter dormancy than white yam.

The Kokoro variety is important in making dried yam chips.

After 7 to 12 months' growth, the tubers are harvested. In Africa, most are pounded into a paste to make the traditional dish of "pounded yam", known as Iyan.

D. alata 

D. alata, called purple yam (not to be confused with the Okinawan purple "yam", which is a sweet potato), greater yam, ube, winged yam, water yam, and (ambiguously) white yam, was first cultivated in Southeast Asia. Although not grown in the same quantities as the African yams, it has the largest distribution worldwide of any cultivated yam, being grown in Asia, the Pacific islands, Africa, and the West Indies. Even in Africa, the popularity of water yam is second only to white yam. The tuber shape is generally cylindrical, but can vary. Tuber flesh is white and watery in texture.

D. alata and D. esculenta (lesser yam) were important staple crops to the seafaring Austronesian cultures. They were carried along with the Austronesian migrations as canoe plants, from Island Southeast Asia to as far as Madagascar and Polynesia.

D. polystachya 

D. polystachya, Chinese yam, is native to China. It is tolerant to frost and can be grown in much cooler conditions than other yams. It is also grown in Korea and Japan.

It was introduced to Europe in the 19th century, when the potato crop there was falling victim to disease, and is still grown in France for the Asian food market.

The tubers are harvested after about 6 months of growth. Some are eaten right after harvesting and some are used as ingredients for other dishes, including noodles, and for traditional medicines.

D. bulbifera 

D. bulbifera, the air potato, is found in both Africa and Asia, with slight differences between those found in each place. It is a large vine,  or more in length. It produces tubers, but the bulbils which grow at the base of its leaves are the more important food product.

Some varieties can be eaten raw, while some require soaking or boiling for detoxification before eating. It is not grown much commercially since the flavor of other yams is preferred by most people. However, it is popular in home vegetable gardens because it produces a crop after only four months of growth and continues producing for the life of the vine, as long as two years. Also, the bulbils are easy to harvest and cook.

In 1905, the air potato was introduced to Florida and has since become an invasive species in much of the state. Its rapid growth crowds out native vegetation and it is very difficult to remove since it can grow back from the tubers, and new vines can grow from the bulbils even after being cut down or burned.

D. esculenta 

D. esculenta, the lesser yam, was one of the first yam species cultivated. It is native to Southeast Asia and is the third-most commonly cultivated species there, although it is cultivated very little in other parts of the world.

The tubers are eaten baked, boiled, or fried much like potatoes. Because of the small size of the tubers, mechanical cultivation is possible, which along with its easy preparation and good flavor, could help the lesser yam to become more popular in the future.

D. dumetorum 
D. dumetorum, the bitter yam, is popular as a vegetable in parts of West Africa, in part because their cultivation requires less labor than other yams. The wild forms are very toxic and are sometimes used to poison animals when mixed with bait. It is said that they have also been used for criminal purposes.

D. trifida 
D. trifida, the cush-cush yam, is native to the Guyana region of South America and is the most important cultivated New World yam. Since they originated in tropical rainforest conditions, their growth cycle is less related to seasonal changes than other yams. Because of their relative ease of cultivation and their good flavor, they are considered to have a great potential for increased production.

Wild taxa

D. hirtiflora subsp. pedicellata 
D. hirtiflora subsp. pedicellata, lusala, busala or lwidi, is native to Tropical Africa. It is widely harvested and eaten in Southern Zambia where it grows in open forest areas. In Southern Zambia, it is an important addition to the March–September diets of almost all, and income of over half of rural households. Research on propagation of this subspecies to alleviate the threat from wild harvest has been successful.

D. japonica 
D. japonica  known as East Asian mountain yam, yamaimo, or Japanese mountain yam  is a type of yam (Dioscorea) native to Japan (including Ryukyu and Bonin Islands), Korea, China, Taiwan, and Assam.

D. japonica is used for food. Jinenjo, also called the wild yam, is a related variety of Japanese yam that is used as an ingredient in soba noodles.

Harvesting 

Yams in West Africa are typically harvested by hand, using sticks, spades, or diggers. Wood-based tools are preferred to metallic tools as they are less likely to damage the fragile tubers; however, wood tools need frequent replacement. Yam harvesting is labor-intensive and physically demanding. Tuber harvesting involves standing, bending, squatting, and sometimes sitting on the ground depending on the size of mound, size of tuber, or depth of tuber penetration. Care must be taken to avoid damage to the tuber, because damaged tubers do not store well and spoil rapidly. Some farmers use staking and mixed cropping, a practice that complicates harvesting in some cases.

In forested areas, tubers grow in areas where other tree roots are present. Harvesting the tuber then involves the additional step of freeing them from other roots. This often causes tuber damage.

Aerial tubers or bulbils are harvested by manual plucking from the vine.

Yields may improve and cost of yam production be lower if mechanization were to be developed and adopted. However, current crop production practices and species used pose considerable hurdles to successful mechanization of yam production, particularly for small-scale rural farmers. Extensive changes in traditional cultivation practices, such as mixed cropping, may be required. Modification of current tuber harvesting equipment is necessary given yam tuber architecture and its different physical properties.

Production 

Storage 

Roots and tubers such as yam are living organisms. When stored, they continue to respire, which results in the oxidation of the starch (a polymer of glucose) contained in the cells of the tuber, which converts it into water, carbon dioxide, and heat energy. During this transformation of the starch, the dry matter of the tuber is reduced.

Amongst the major roots and tubers, properly stored yam is considered to be the least perishable. Successful storage of yams requires:
 initial selection of sound and healthy yams
 proper curing, if possible combined with fungicide treatment
 adequate ventilation to remove the heat generated by respiration of the tubers
 regular inspection during storage and removal of rotting tubers and any sprouts that develop
 protection from direct sunlight and rain

Storing yam at low temperature reduces the respiration rates. However, temperatures below  cause damage through chilling, causing a breakdown of internal tissues, increasing water loss and yam's susceptibility to decay. The symptoms of chilling injury are not always obvious when the tubers are still in cold storage. The injury becomes noticeable as soon as the tubers are restored to ambient temperatures.

Most countries that grow yams as a staple food are too poor to afford high-technology storage systems.

Sprouting rapidly increases a tuber's respiration rates, and accelerates the rate at which its food value decreases.

Certain cultivars of yams store better than others. The easier to store yams are those adapted to arid climate, where they tend to stay in a dormant low-respiration stage much longer than yam breeds adapted to humid tropical lands, where they do not need dormancy. Yellow yam and cush-cush yam, by nature, have much shorter dormancy periods than water yam, white yam, or lesser yam.

Storage losses for yams are very high in Africa, with bacteria, insects, nematodes, and mammals being the most common storage pests.

Nutrition 

Raw yam has only moderate nutrient density, with appreciable content (10% or more of the Daily Value, DV) limited to potassium, vitamin B6, manganese, thiamin, dietary fiber, and vitamin C (table). But raw yam has the highest potassium levels amongst the 10 major staple foods of the world (see nutritional chart). Yam supplies 118 calories per 100 grams. Yam generally has a lower glycemic index, about 54% of glucose per 150 gram serving, compared to potato products.

The protein content and quality of roots and tubers is lower than other food staples, with the content of yam and potato  being around 2% on a fresh-weight basis. Yams, with cassava, provide a much greater proportion of the protein intake in Africa, ranging from 5.9% in East and South Africa to about 15.9% in humid West Africa.

As a relatively low-protein food, yam is not a good source of essential amino acids. Experts emphasize the need to supplement a yam-dominant diet with more protein-rich foods to support healthy growth in children.

Yam is an important dietary element for Nigerian and West African people. It contributes more than 200 calories per person per day for more than 150 million people in West Africa, and is an important source of income. Yam is an attractive crop in poor farms with limited resources. It is rich in starch, and can be prepared in many ways. It is available all year round, unlike other, unreliable, seasonal crops. These characteristics make yam a preferred food and a culturally important food security crop in some sub-Saharan African countries.

Comparison to other staple foods 
The following table shows the nutrient content of yam and major staple foods in a raw harvested form on a dry weight basis to account for their different water contents. Raw forms, however, are not edible and cannot be digested. These must be sprouted, or prepared and cooked for human consumption. In sprouted or cooked form, the relative nutritional and antinutritional contents of each of these staples is remarkably different from that of raw form of these staples.

Phytochemicals and use in medicine 
The tubers of certain wild yams, including a variant of 'Kokoro' yam and other species of Dioscorea, such as Dioscorea nipponica, are a source for the extraction of diosgenin, a sapogenin steroid. The extracted diosgenin is used for the commercial synthesis of cortisone, pregnenolone, progesterone, and other steroid products. Such preparations were used in early combined oral contraceptive pills. The unmodified steroid has estrogenic activity.

Consumption 

Yams are consumed in a variety of preparations, such as flour or whole vegetable pieces across their range of distribution in Asia, Africa, North America, Central America, the Caribbean, South America, and Oceania.

Africa 

Yams of African species must be cooked to be safely eaten, because various natural substances in yams can cause illness if consumed raw. The most common cooking methods in Western and Central Africa are by boiling, frying or roasting.

Among the Akan of Ghana, boiled yam can be mashed with palm oil into eto in a similar manner to the plantain dish matoke, and is served with eggs. The boiled yam can also be pounded with a traditional mortar and pestle to create a thick, starchy paste known as iyan (pounded yam) which is eaten with traditional sauces such as egusi and palm nut soup.

Another method of consumption is to leave the raw yam pieces to dry in the sun. When dry, the pieces turn a dark brown color. These are then milled to create a brown powder known in Nigeria as elubo. The powder can be mixed with boiling water to create a thick starchy paste, a kind of pudding known as amala, which is then eaten with local soups and sauces.

Yams are a staple agricultural commodity in West Africa with cultural significance, where over 95% of the world's yam crop is harvested. Yams are still important for survival in these regions. Some varieties of these tubers can be stored up to six months without refrigeration, which makes them a valuable resource for the yearly period of food scarcity at the beginning of the wet season. Yam cultivars are also cultivated in other humid tropical countries.

Yam is the main staple crop of the Igbos in south eastern Nigeria where for centuries it played a dominant role in both their agricultural and cultural life. It is celebrated with annual yam festivals.

Brazil 
Yams are particularly consumed in the coastal area of the Northeast region, although they can be found in other parts of the country. In Pernambuco state, it is usually boiled and served cut in slices at breakfast, along with cheese spread or molasses.

Colombia 
In Colombia yam production has been specifically located in the Caribbean region, where it has become a key product in the diet of the population of this area. In 2010, Colombia was among the 12 countries with the highest yam production worldwide, and ranked first in yield of tons per hectare planted. Although its main use is for food, several studies have shown its usefulness in the pharmaceutical industry and the manufacture of bioplastics. However, in Colombia, there is no evidence of the use of this product, other than food.

Philippines 

In the Philippines, the purple ube species of yam (D. alata), is eaten as a sweetened dessert called ube halaya, and is also used as an ingredient in another Filipino dessert, halo-halo. It is also used as a popular ingredient for ice cream.

Vietnam 
In Vietnam, the same purple yam is used for preparing a special type of soup canh khoai mỡ or fatty yam soup. This involves mashing the yam and cooking it until very well done. The yam root was traditionally used by peasants in Vietnam to dye cotton clothes throughout the Red River and Mekong delta regions as late as the mid-20th century, and is still used by others in the Sapa region of northern Vietnam.

Indonesia 
In Indonesia, the same purple yam is used for preparing desserts. This involves mashing the yam and mixing it with coconut milk and sugar. White- and off-white-fleshed yams are cut in cubes, cooked, lightly fermented, and eaten as afternoon snacks.

Japan 

An exception to the cooking rule is the mountain yam (Dioscorea polystachya), known as nagaimo and can be further classified into ichōimo (lit. 'ginkgo-leaf yam'; kanji: 銀杏芋), or yamatoimo (lit. Yamato yam; kanji: 大和芋), depending on the root shape.

Mountain yam is eaten raw and grated, after only a relatively minimal preparation: the whole tubers are briefly soaked in a vinegar-water solution to neutralize irritant oxalate crystals found in their skin. The raw vegetable is starchy and bland, mucilaginous when grated, and may be eaten plain as a side dish, or added to noodles.

Another variety of yam, jinenjo, is used in Japan as an ingredient in soba noodles. In Okinawa, purple yams (Dioscorea alata) are grown. This purple yam is popular as lightly deep-fried tempura, as well as being grilled or boiled. Additionally, the purple yam is a common ingredient of yam ice cream with the signature purple color. Purple yam is also used in other types of traditional wagashi sweets, cakes, and candy.

India 
In central parts of India, the yam is prepared by being finely sliced, seasoned with spices, and deep fried. In Southern India, the vegetable is a popular accompaniment to rice dishes and curry. The purple yam, D. alata, is also eaten in India, where it is also called the violet yam. Species may be called by the regional name "taradi", which can refer to D. belophylla, Dioscorea deltoidea, and D. bulbifera. Digging and selling taradi is a major source of income in the region of Palampur.

Nepal 
Dioscorea root is traditionally eaten on Māgh Sankrānti (a midwinter festival) in Nepal. It is usually steamed and then cooked with spices.

Fiji Islands 
Yam is, along with cassava and taro, a staple food, and is consumed boiled, roasted in a lovo, or steamed with fish or meat in curry sauce or coconut milk and served with rice. The cost of yam is higher due to the difficulty in farming and relatively low volume of production.

Jamaica 
Because of their abundance and importance to survival, yams were highly regarded in Jamaican ceremonies and constitute part of many traditional West African ceremonies.

The West 
Yam powder is available in the West from grocers specializing in African products, and may be used in a similar manner to instant mashed potato powder, although preparation is a little more difficult because of the tendency of the yam powder to form lumps. The powder is sprinkled onto a pan containing a small amount of boiling water and stirred vigorously. The resulting mixture is served with a heated sauce, such as tomato and chili, poured onto it.

Skinned and cut frozen yams may also be available from specialty grocers.

Toxicity 

Unlike cassava, most varieties of edible, mature, cultivated yam do not contain toxic compounds. However, there are exceptions. Bitter compounds tend to accumulate in immature tuber tissues of white and yellow yams. These may be polyphenols or tannin-like compounds.

Wild forms of bitter yams (D. dumetorum) do contain some toxins, such as dihydrodioscorine, that taste bitter, hence are referred to as bitter yam. Bitter yams are not normally eaten except at times of desperation in poor countries and in times of local food scarcity. They are usually detoxified by soaking in a vessel of salt water, in cold or hot fresh water or in a stream. The bitter compounds in these yams are water-soluble alkaloids which, on ingestion, produce severe and distressing symptoms. Severe cases of alkaloid intoxication may prove fatal.

Aerial or potato yams (D. bulbifera) have antinutritional factors. In Asia, detoxification methods, involving water extraction, fermentation, and roasting of the grated tuber, are used for bitter cultivars of this yam. The bitter compounds in yams also known locally as air potato include diosbulbin and possibly saponins, such as diosgenin. In Indonesia, an extract of air potato is used in the preparation of arrow poison.

Cultural aspects 

Historical records in West Africa and of African yams in Europe date back to the 16th century. Yams were taken to the Americas through precolonial Portuguese and Spanish on the borders of Brazil and Guyana, followed by a dispersion through the Caribbean.

Yams are used in Papua New Guinea, where they are called kaukau. Their cultivation and harvesting is accompanied by complex rituals and taboos. The coming of the yams (one of the numerous versions from Maré) is described in Pene Nengone (Loyalty Islands of New Caledonia).

Nigeria and Ghana 
A yam festival is usually held in the beginning of August at the end of the rainy season. People offer yams to gods and ancestors first, before distributing them to the villagers. This is their way of giving thanks to the spirits above them.

The New Yam Festival celebrates the main agricultural crop of the Igbos, Idomas, and Tivs. The New Yam Festival, known as Orureshi in Owukpa in Idoma west and Ima-Ji, Iri-Ji or Iwa Ji in Igbo land, is a celebration depicting the prominence of yam in social and cultural life. The festival is prominent among southeastern states and major tribes in Benue State, mainly around August.

The Igbo people accord special respect to yam to the extent that no one eats the newly harvested yam until the New Yam celebrations / feast is marked. It is called Iri ji ọhụrụ. People return to their various communities for the celebrations.

References

External links 

 

 
Crops originating from Africa
Dioscorea
Flora of Jamaica
Igbo cuisine
Root vegetables
Staple foods
Tropical agriculture
Tubers
Yoruba cuisine
Crops
Plant dyes